The purpose of copyright registration is to place on record a verifiable account of the date and content of the work in question, so that in the event of a legal claim, or case of infringement or plagiarism, the copyright owner can produce a copy of the work from an official government source.

Before 1978, in the United States, federal copyright was generally secured by the act of publication with notice of copyright or by registration of an unpublished work. This has now been largely superseded by international conventions, principally the Berne Convention, which provide rights harmonized at an international level without a requirement for national registration. However, the U.S. still provides legal advantages for registering works of U.S. origin. For example, a registration is required before an infringement suit may be filed in a US court and registration is required for claiming statutory damages in most cases.

Requirement of registration
It is a common misconception to confuse copyright registration with the granting of copyright. Copyright in most countries today is automatic on "fixation" – it applies as soon as the work is fixed in some tangible medium. This standard is established internationally by the Berne Convention (1886), which most countries have signed onto since.  Registration may be required by countries before joining Berne. For instance, the US required registration of copyrighted works before it signed onto the Berne Convention in 1989; at that point, registration was no longer required for works to be copyrighted in the US.

The observation that registration is not required in the United States, however, has been described as misleading. This is partly because registration remains a prerequisite to filing an infringement suit, and also because important remedies depend on prompt registration—such as attorneys fees and statutory damages. At least one commentator has questioned whether the conditioning of legal recourse on registration is inconsistent with the United States' obligations under the Berne Convention regarding "formalities".

Scholarship on reinstating registration requirements
Some scholars and policy advocates (such as law professor and activist Lawrence Lessig and U.S. Representative Zoe Lofgren) have called for returning to a system of registration requirements and possibly other formalities such as copyright notice.  The system of automatic copyright on fixation has been cited as one of the factors behind the growth of so-called "orphan works" in, for instance, the U.S. Copyright Office's 2006 report on orphan works.  UC Berkeley's Law School held a conference in 2013 on the question of "Reform(aliz)ing Copyright for the Internet Age?", noting that "Formalities, which in the past three decades have largely disappeared from American copyright law, may be about to stage a comeback. ... [R]ecent research on formalities suggests that we can get many of the benefits that formalities promise for a more efficient and focused copyright law, without the problems that led us to do away with them in the first place."

Registering agencies
In Canada, copyrighted works can be registered at the Canadian Intellectual Property Office for a fee.
In Kenya, copyrighted works can be registered at the Kenya Copyrights Board for a small fee.
In the United Kingdom, there is no official registration regime for copyrights. Commercial services provide a registration facility where copies of work can be lodged to establish legal evidence of a copyright claim. There are also requirements to file certain published works with the British Library and, on request, the five legal deposit libraries.
In the United States, the United States Copyright Office accepts registrations. For works created in the US by US citizens, a registration is also required before an infringement suit may be filed in a US court. Furthermore, copyright holders cannot claim statutory damages or attorney's fees unless the work was registered prior to infringement, or within three months of publication.

Finding copyright registrations
All United States copyright registrations and renewals registered since 1978 have been published online at the
Copyright Office website. Registrations and renewals prior to 1978 were published in semi-annual softcover Copyright Catalogs. For films from 1894 to 1969, inclusive, Library of Congress published hardcover Cumulative Copyright Catalogs, each covering ten or more years.

Please see the Copyright Catalog article for links to download digital copies of these pre-1978 US catalogs.

Requirements by country

See also 
 Copyright formalities 
 Public domain
 Copyright renewal

References

Further reading

External links
World Intellectual Property Organization - Directory of Intellectual Property Offices

Copyright law